Joseph Isaac (born January 17, 1998), better known as his stage name SleazyWorld Go, is an American rapper. He gained popularity in 2022 after achieving online virality, particularly after the release of his single "Sleazy Flow".

Early life
SleazyWorld Go was born and raised in Grand Rapids, MI. He was moved to Kansas City, Missouri in his teen years.

Career
SleazyWorld Go achieved viral success online through such platforms like TikTok and Instagram. SleazyWorld Go initially emerged following his Sleazy mixtape, which was released on September 12, 2021.

SleazyWorld Go first started rapping in 2020, after he had been released from prison. He first released "Sliding", and then started releasing more songs, such as "Baghdad Flow" and "What They Gone Do To Me".

He released "Sleazy Flow" in 2021. It went viral in 2022, being used on the platform TikTok. It got remixed by rappers like 30 Deep Grimeyy, Yungeen Ace, and NLE Choppa. However, an official remix with Lil Baby was released on May 26, 2022.

On June 17, 2022, he released a single called "Step 1" with rapper Offset.

Discography

Studio albums

Singles

Awards and nominations

References

Further reading
 
 
 

1998 births
21st-century American rappers
African-American male rappers
Living people
Trap musicians
Drill musicians
Rappers from Michigan
Rappers from Missouri
Midwest hip hop musicians